Friedel Schirmer (20 March 1926 – 30 November 2014) was a German athlete. He competed in the men's decathlon at the 1952 Summer Olympics.

References

External links
 

1926 births
2014 deaths
Athletes (track and field) at the 1952 Summer Olympics
German decathletes
Olympic athletes of Germany
People from Stadthagen
Sportspeople from Lower Saxony